"The Man Without a Temperament" is a 1920 short story by Katherine Mansfield. It was first published in Arts and Letters in Spring 1920, and later reprinted in Bliss and Other Stories.

Plot summary
Mrs Jinnie Salesby has tea with her husband, Robert. She receives a letter from Lottie, ill with neuritis, who says it is snowing in London. Then The Honeymoon Couple come back from fishing. The Salesbys go for a turn; she stops and sits while he goes on for a longer walk. He comes upon the Countess and the General in a carriage; they spurn him. He then walks on, imagines he is going back home for dinner, with Dennis and Beaty as guests. Instead, he gets back to his wife and they return to the dining-room for dinner, with all the other couples.

Characters
Mr Robert Salesby
Mrs Jinny Salesby; she suffers from a heart disease.
The Two Topknots
The American Woman, and her pet Klaymongso
the servant-girl
Antonio, a servant.
Lottie
The Honeymoon Couple
The Countess
The General
Dennis
Beaty
Millie

Major themes
married life

Literary significance
The text is written in the modernist mode, without a set structure, and with many shifts in the narrative.

References to other works
Alexander Pope's Satires, Epistles and Odes of Horace, Satire I, Book 2, is quoted.

Footnotes

External links
Full text

Modernist short stories
1920 short stories
Short stories by Katherine Mansfield
Works originally published in literary magazines